Copelatus bangalorensis is a species of diving beetle. It is part of the genus Copelatus in the subfamily Copelatinae of the family Dytiscidae. It was described by Vazirani in 1970. It is endemic to Mysore, India.

References

bangalorensis
Beetles described in 1970
Endemic fauna of India